Minangkabau Football Club was an Indonesian football club based in Padang, West Sumatra. The team played in Liga Primer Indonesia.

2011 Squad

References

External links
Minangkabau F.C. at ligaprimerindonesia.co.id

Defunct football clubs in Indonesia
Football clubs in Indonesia
Association football clubs established in 2010
2010 establishments in Indonesia